Big City Park is a live action puppet show, aimed at preschoolers and shot on location in Ormeau Park, Belfast, Northern Ireland. Big City Park is an original property created, written and produced by Sixteen South in co-production with BBC Scotland.

Premise and production 
Big City Park is a 26 x 14 minute preschool show that aims to get children outdoors and rediscover the awe and wonder of nature. The show features Billy the badger, Dara the fox and a troll called Ruairi, who all live in the park - along with their human friend, May the park keeper.

It was a BBC featured show for August 2010 and rated very highly with over 24% of the audience. It peaked with an audience share of 341,000 on 20 August with an average of 244,000 across the series. It was the second most watched show in its slot on CBeebies during August 2010 and the first show attracted 19,000 viewers on BBC iPlayer alone.

Episodes

Awards 
 BAFTA Scotland for Best Children's Series - 2011
 IFTA Award for Best Youth/Children's programme, Ireland - 2011
 Silver Plaque - Hugo Award, Chicago - 2011
 CINE Golden Eagle - 2011
 Commended - Celtic Media Festival – 2011

External links
 

2010 British television series debuts
2010 British television series endings
2010s British children's television series
BBC children's television shows
British preschool education television series
British television shows featuring puppetry
English-language television shows
CBeebies